"Big" Paul Williams (Paul Humphrey) is an American bluegrass and gospel musician. He took the surname Williams when he began his musical career in the early 1950s. He was guitarist and lead singer for the Lonesome Pine Fiddlers before replacing Earl Taylor in the Sunny Mountain Boys in 1957, playing mandolin and being featured regularly as a lead singer.

He played with Jimmy Martin at the height of the Sunny Mountain Boys career, recording steadily through 1962 and at times competing for popularity with Elvis Presley. Williams is said to have helped shape Martin's sound. He was present in the recording process for what Martin has said were the "biggest selling records I've ever done." Williams co-wrote the perennially popular hit "Hold Watcha Got."

During William’s career he managed to write many iconic bluegrass songs that are now held highly with significant historical value. Songs such as Mr. Engineer, My Walkin’ Shoes Don’t Fit Me Anymore, Steppin’ Stones, Hold Watcha Got, Don’t Cry To Me, Prayer Bells Of Heaven and I Like To Hear Them Preach It, Brown Eyed Darling, Just to name a few. 

Williams left from Jimmy Martin and the Sunny Mountain Boys in 1962. He married Jimmy Martin's half sister who told him that "he couldn't play bluegrass music and live for the Lord." He went on to play gospel music with the Northside Quartet and later on achieved some success and a Grammy nomination with the Victory Trio, based out of his hometown, Morristown, Tennessee. 

Williams started his own band the Victory Trio in 1995 with Banjo player Jerry Keys, Bass player Susie Keys along with Dan Moneyhun and Adam Winstead. His band has alway been considered a vessel to spread the Christian faith for Williams. 

Shortly after retiring from touring with the victory trio Williams teamed up again with Bluegrass legends JD Crowe and Doyle Lawson and recorded a series of albums full of original Jimmy Martin Songs, some of which Williams helped write.

References

Bibliography
 Donaghey, Bob (1999) Bluegrass Yearbook: Your Favorite Bluegrass Festival Performers, p. 3-4,  .
 Willis, Barry R. & Dick Weissman (1989) America's Music: Bluegrass: A history of bluegrass music in the words of its pioneers, p. 162, 217, 268, 272, 458, 519,  .
 Rice, Wayne (1999) Bluegrass Bios: Profiles of the Stars of Bluegrass, p. 118, no ISBN .
 Rice, Wayne (2002) Bluegrass Bios: Profiles of the Stars of Bluegrass, p. 137, no ISBN .
 Lawless, John. "Paul Williams Hangs up His Walkin' Shoes." Bluegrass Today, December 13, 2016. https://bluegrasstoday.com/paul-williams-hangs-up-his-walkin-shoes/. 
 Thompson, Richard. "On This Day #37 - Paul Williams." Bluegrass Today, December 13, 2016. https://bluegrasstoday.com/on-this-day-37-paul-williams/. 
 Thompson, Richard. "Don't Give Your Heart to a Rambler – Barbara Martin Stephens." Bluegrass Today, August 9, 2018. https://bluegrasstoday.com/dont-give-your-heart-to-a-rambler-barbara-martin-stephens/.

External links 
 Paul Williams' Rebel Records Artist Page
 Rice, Wayne, BluegrassBios.com, Profiles of the Stars of Bluegrass, Retrieved August 3, 2017 .

American bluegrass guitarists
American male guitarists
Living people
Year of birth missing (living people)
American bluegrass mandolinists